Paul Sanchez est revenu! is a French film directed by Patricia Mazuy, from a screenplay by Mazuy and Yves Thomas. It was released on 18 July 2018. Welsh musician John Cale, who previously collaborated with Mazuy on The King's Daughters (2000) and Sport de filles (2011), composed the original music score.

Plot
February 2017. In Roquebrune-sur-Argens, people report to Gendarmerie Nationale about the return of Paul Sanchez, who fled from Cahors four years ago after having committed a severe crime. This story even makes a local journal reporter Yohann Poulain forget about the chief gendarme driving a costly Porsche unlawfully confiscated from Johnny Depp, and investigate this case instead. People never forgot about Paul Sanchez who, had killed his wife Violette with four children (Florent, Baptiste, Laura, and Marie) on 19 September 2006 in Cahors and had their corpses burned for an unknown reason.

Paul Sanchez contacts Yohann Poulain via e-mail. For that reason, the reporter is contacted by a female gendarme named Marion Boulicaut who participates in phone calls with Sanchez upon his request. Sanchez wants somebody to listen up to him and tells her about the tyrant inside his head who orders him to kill people around.

Later on, while on hiking in mountains in her leisure time, Marion gets on tracks of Sanchez and ties him up. Having confessed at first, later he begins insisting on not being Sanchez, but Didier Gérard, pool engineer. Marion takes his spit for DNA analysis and leaves him tied up at garden shed without food and water.

Investigating on Didier Gérard, Marion comes to a conclusion that Gérard went mad and is going to kill his proper wife and three children. She rushes towards his wife, who has been reporting to gendarmes about Gérard's loss for several days. While on premises, spouses meet and Marion eliminates Gérard attempting to kill his wife.

Yohann Poulain publishes his book titled Paul Sanchez est revenu! Being interviewed on TV, he announces that he is seeking for Marion who left her service with Gendarmerie Nationale after the events, and fled away from Roquebrune-sur-Argens.

Production
The film was announced in February 2017 with SBS as a distributor. Principal photography began in February 2017 in Roquebrune-sur-Argens and was completed by 31 March 2017.

References

External links
 

2018 films
2010s French-language films
Films directed by Patricia Mazuy
Films scored by John Cale
French thriller films
2010s thriller films
2010s French films